The 2002–03 Albanian National Championship was the 64th season of the Albanian National Championship, the top professional league for association football clubs, since its establishment in 1930.

Teams

Stadia and last season

League table

Results

Playoffs

Relegation playoff

Season statistics

Top goalscorers

Notes

References
Albania - List of final tables (RSSSF)

Kategoria Superiore seasons
1
Kategoria Superiore